Jean Govaerts (born 1 September 1938) is a Belgian former cyclist. He competed in the 1000m time trial at the 1960 Summer Olympics.

References

External links
 

1938 births
Living people
Belgian male cyclists
Cyclists at the 1960 Summer Olympics
Olympic cyclists of Belgium
People from Schoten
Cyclists from Antwerp Province